Mihailo Stevanović may refer to:
Mihailo Stevanović (linguist) (1903–2001), Serbian linguist
Mihailo Stevanovic (footballer) (born 2002), Swiss footballer